The Junkers Ju 90 was a 40-seat, four-engine airliner developed for and used by Deutsche Luft Hansa shortly before World War II. It was based on the rejected Ju 89 bomber. During the war, the Luftwaffe impressed them as military transports.

Design and development
The Junkers Ju 90 airliner and transport series descended directly from the Junkers Ju 89, a contender in the Ural bomber programme aimed at producing a long-range strategic bomber. This concept was abandoned by the Reichsluftfahrtministerium (RLM, Reich Aviation Ministry) in April 1937 in favour of smaller, faster bombers. Design was headed by Ernst Zindel. Development was headed by Professor Herbert Wagner.

Civil development
Deutsche Luft Hansa put a request for a long-distance commercial aircraft as early as 1933. When the Ju 89 program was abandoned, the third prototype was partially completed and at the request of Luft Hansa, it was rebuilt as an airliner, retaining the wings and tail of the original design, but incorporating a new, wider, passenger-carrying fuselage. The new design was designated the Ju 90.

The Junkers Ju 90 was a four-engine all-metal, low-wing aircraft fitted with twin end-plate vertical stabilizers. The wings were built around five tubular girder spars covered with a smooth stressed skin. The leading edge was quite markedly swept, the trailing edge almost straight. The Junkers "double wing", a full-span movable flap/aileron combination, was fitted. The tail units on the prototypes used the traditional Junkers corrugated skin, the only part of the aircraft to do so, abandoning the exposed corrugated skinning on later Ju 90 production models for the Luftwaffe. The fins and rudders, the latter with prominent horn balances assemblies, were placed at the end of the tailplane; this latter carried the elevators separated by a gap, forming another double wing. These components were as used in the Ju 89.

The new fuselage was of oval cross-section, covered by stressed smooth duralumin skin. On the first four Ju 90As, five pairs of rectangular windows were on each side, each double pair lighting a divided-off section of the cabin containing eight seats in facing pairs on either side of a central aisle. The Ju 90B, whose prototypes were the Ju 90 V5 through the Ju 90 V10 aircraft, adopted round fuselage portholes. The Ju 90 V11 became the definitive Ju 290 prototype with smaller, rectangular fuselage windows.

The Ju 90B series were visually distinctive because of their oval tail fins. The Ju 90 V6 was withdrawn from test flights, and rebuilt as the Ju 390 V1 prototype. The Ju 90 V9 was also withdrawn and rebuilt as the Ju 390V2, later redesignated in October 1944 as the Ju 390A-1. The Ju 90 V10's rebuild into the Ju 390 V3 bomber prototype was commenced, but was scrapped at the factory in June 1944. The Junkers firm was paid compensation for seven Ju 390s under construction, when Ju 390 orders were cancelled.

The plane had four or five divided fuselage sections, the latter holding the maximum of 40 passengers. Toilets, a cloakroom and a mail store were placed aft, and a baggage hold was forward of the passenger space. The fuselage was generous by the standards of the time with an internal width of 2.83 m (9 ft 3½ in).

The tailwheel undercarriage was fully retractable, with the single-wheel main units raising hydraulically into the inner engine nacelles.

The first prototype, the Ju 90 V1, was powered by four Daimler-Benz DB 600C liquid-cooled inverted V engines delivering 820 kW (1,100 hp) each. These were more powerful than both those of its Ju 89 predecessor and of production commercial Ju 90s. Named Der Grosse Dessauer as had been the earlier Junkers G 38, its maiden flight took place on 28 August 1937. Deutsche Luft Hansa carried out the long-distance testing. After eight months of flight tests, this prototype broke up on 6 February 1938 during over-speed tests.

A second prototype (V2) was delivered to Luft Hansa in May 1938 for testing. Like all the production commercial Ju 90s, this was powered by four BMW 132 radial engines delivering 620 kW (830 hp). The move to lower power was probably necessitated by the demands on Daimler Benz to produce engines for strategically important, frontline aircraft. They named this aircraft Preussen. It crashed fatally during tropical flight tests on takeoff in November 1938 at Bathurst, Gambia, probably because of engine failure.

Despite these setbacks, Luft Hansa ordered eight of the production type A-1s.
They also used the next two prototypes, starting with V3 Bayern which flew on the Berlin-Vienna route from July 1938. This aircraft flew a total of 62,572 km ( mi) in 1938. Only seven of the A-1s were delivered to Luft Hansa, the last in April 1940, one going directly to the Luftwaffe.

South African Airways also ordered two A-1s with Pratt & Whitney Twin Wasp engines delivering 670 kW (900 hp). These were known by the alternative designation Z-3 to distinguish them from the BMW-powered Z-2. Neither of these was delivered to SAA, but went instead to the Luftwaffe. As the war progressed, the surviving six Luft Hansa airframes were also impressed into Luftwaffe service,
though two were returned to Luft Hansa later. Four of these aircraft took part in the invasion of Norway.

The fourth prototype V4 went into Luftwaffe service in July 1941 fitted with 980 kW (1,320 hp) Jumo 211F/L engines.

Military development

In April 1939, the RLM asked Junkers for a further development of the Ju 90 for military transport purposes. The Ju 90V5 and V6 were the prototypes of this military design. They got a new wing with a straight inner section leading edge, of greater span (19%) and area (11%). The landing gear was strengthened with twin main wheels and the fins were more rounded, lacking the characteristic horn balance nick of the earlier models. The windows were replaced by 10 small portholes a side. The Ju 90 V5 flew first on 5 December 1939. A special feature of both the V5 and V6 was a powered boarding ramp in the floor of the rear section of the fuselage for loading cars and larger cargo freight. This Trapoklappe ramp, when lowered, was powerful enough to raise the fuselage to the horizontal flying position. Both aircraft were retroactively fitted with the much more powerful, unitized Kraftei-mount 1,200 kW (1,600 hp) BMW 801MA radials, with the first suffix letter "M" signifying the initial Motoranlage format of unitized powerplant installation design promulgated by the RLM. Ju 90s were also used as tugs for heavy gliders.

The two last prototypes – the V7 and V8 – fed directly into the Ju 290 development programme. The former had a fuselage extension of 1.98 m (6 ft 6 in) and the addition of dihedral to the tailplane to solve a yaw instability. A reconnaissance prototype aerodynamically similar to the V7, the V8 was armed, however, with two 20 mm MG 151/20 cannons and up to nine 13 mm (.51 in) MG 131 machine guns in two dorsal, one ventral, and one tail position.

Ju 290 / 390 development
Some of the Ju 90s were converted into prototypes of the bigger Ju 290 transport and reconnaissance aircraft. The more powerful engines and other modifications to the Ju 90 V5 and V7 were steps in this direction and the latter was converted into the Ju 290 V3. The Ju 90 V8 became the second prototype Ju 290 V2. An uncompleted 11th A-series machine was turned into the Ju 290 V1. The Ju 90 V6 airframe was used in the construction of the Junkers Ju 390 V1.

Numbers and survivors
In the end, only 18 Ju 90s of all versions were completed. Just two survived the war to fall into Allied hands, but both were scrapped soon afterwards.
A military transport JU 90 was shot down on July 23rd 1943 south of Bastia, North Corsica. The wreck is easily accessible to scuba divers and 70% complete

Operators
 Germany
 Luftwaffe
 Deutsche Luft Hansa

Accidents and incidents

Specifications (Ju 90A-1)

See also

References

External links

 Four Miles a Minute Sky Sleeper Sleeps Forty, January 1938, Popular Mechanics article with rare photos of JU-90V1 version and interior photos
 WW2 in Color very good information on the JU-90 history

1930s German airliners
1930s German military transport aircraft
World War II transport aircraft of Germany
Ju 090
Four-engined tractor aircraft
Low-wing aircraft
Aircraft first flown in 1937
Four-engined piston aircraft
Twin-tail aircraft